Bob Kick, the Mischievous Kid is a 1903 French short silent film by Georges Méliès. It was sold by Méliès's Star Film Company and is numbered 510–511 in its catalogues.

Méliès plays Bob Kick in the film, which uses pyrotechnics, substitution splices, and multiple exposures to create its special effects. The film is one of several of Méliès's trick films in which magical effects are used to suggest a theme of illusive female beauty.

Two identical paper prints of the film, representing the film's American and French releases, survive at the Library of Congress. Variant versions of the film may exist; in a 1981 guide to Méliès's films, published by the Centre national de la cinématographie, the editors reported that the ending they saw differed from the one  summarized by John Frazer in his 1979 book Artificially Arranged Scenes: The Films of Georges Méliès.

References

External links
 

French black-and-white films
Films directed by Georges Méliès
French silent short films
1900s French films